The Cullman Times is a newspaper published in Cullman, Alabama, covering Cullman County, Alabama. It is owned by CNHI, LLC who acquired it from Hollinger in 1998.

Producing print, online, mobile, magazines and other specialty multimedia products and services, The Cullman Times has been printed since 1901 – it's the successor to the Cullman Democrat, 1901, the Cullman Banner, 1937, and the Cullman Times Democrat, 1954. Today, the newspaper's print edition is published every day except Sundays, Mondays and Fridays and legal holidays when mail is not delivered.

The company's products comprise Cullman's No. 1 media business, including cullmantimes.com, which allows the news operation to serve its audience 24 hours a day, seven days a week. Additionally, The Times also publishes the weekly Times Extra, the quarterly Cullman Magazine, the quarterly Cullman County Senior Magazine, the annual Cullman County Football Preview magazine, the annual Cullman County Senior Directory, the annual Salute to Industry magazine and the Classic Cullman magazine annually in partnership with the Cullman Area Chamber of Commerce.

In April 2020, The North Jefferson News merged with The Cullman Times.

Awards

2021 APA Media Awards - Editorial - Alabama Press Association

2021 APA Media Awards - Advertising - Alabama Press Association

References

External links 
 Cullman Times Website
 CNHI Website

Newspapers published in Alabama
Cullman County, Alabama
Daily newspapers published in the United States